"Missing You" is a song written and recorded by singer/songwriter Dan Fogelberg in 1981 at the Bennett House studios in Franklin, Tennessee with producer and Elvis Presley bassist Norbert Putnam and drummer Joe Vitale who was known for his work providing a Latin feel to recordings with Stephen Stills Manassas Band and on CSN's song Dark Star. Previously unreleased, Missing You was included on his Greatest Hits LP and released simultaneously.

"Missing You" peaked at number 23 on the Billboard Hot 100.  It reached number 29 in Canada.

The song was a much bigger Adult Contemporary hit.  It reached number 11 on the Canadian AC chart and number six on the U.S. chart.

Chart performance

References

External links
 

1982 songs
1982 singles
Dan Fogelberg songs
Songs written by Dan Fogelberg
Full Moon Records singles
Songs about loneliness